The Dallas–Fort Worth Film Critics Association Award for Best Animated Film is an award presented by the Dallas–Fort Worth Film Critics Association (DFWFCA) to honor an outstanding animated film. Toy Story is the only franchise with multiple wins, winning for Toy Story 3 (2010) and Toy Story 4 (2019).

Winners

 † = Winner of the Academy Award for Best Animated Feature

1990s

2000s

2010s

2020s

Multiple wins and nominations

Wins
Brad Bird - 3
Pete Docter - 3
Byron Howard - 2
Henry Selick - 2
Lee Unkrich - 2

Nominations
John Lasseter - 5 (one win)
Ron Clements and John Musker - 4 (one win)

References

Awards for best animated feature film
Animated
Lists of films by award